The dense-scale lanternshark (Etmopterus pycnolepis) is a shark of the family Etmopteridae found in the southeast Pacific off Peru and Chile.

References

 
 Compagno, Dando, & Fowler, Sharks of the World, Princeton University Press, New Jersey 2005 

Etmopterus
Fish described in 1990